"Sea of Love" is a song by American indie rock band The National. Written by band members Matt Berninger and Aaron Dessner, it appears as the fifth track on the band's sixth studio album Trouble Will Find Me. "Sea of Love" was released as the album's fourth single on September 2, 2013. The music video for the song, which preceded its release as a radio single, debuted on May 8, 2013.

Personnel 
Credits adapted from Trouble Will Find Me liner notes.

 Matt Berninger – lead vocals
 Aaron Dessner – guitar, keyboards, vibraphone, harmonica
 Bryce Dessner – guitar, keyboards, e-bow, orchestration 
 Bryan Devendorf – drums, percussion
 Scott Devendorf – bass guitar

Release history

References 

2013 singles
2013 songs
The National (band) songs
4AD singles
Songs written by Matt Berninger
Songs written by Aaron Dessner
Songs written by Bryce Dessner
Song recordings produced by Aaron Dessner
Song recordings produced by Bryce Dessner